Valley of the Rogue State Park is a state park in west central Jackson County, Oregon, near Grants Pass and Medford, and is administered by the Oregon Parks and Recreation Department.  It lies along the banks of the Rogue River, adjacent to Interstate 5.  The park offers a year-round, full-service campground, a nature trail, a day-use area, and river access for boating, fishing, and swimming.

Climate

See also
 List of Oregon State Parks

References

External links
 

State parks of Oregon
Parks in Jackson County, Oregon